Anastasia Masaro (born November 12, 1974) is a production designer who was nominated for both an Academy Award and a British Academy Film Award for the film The Imaginarium of Doctor Parnassus.

Selected filmography
 Tully (2018)
 XX (2017)
 Life (2015)
 Arcade Fire: Reflektor (2013)
 Pawn Shop Chronicles (2013) 
 Mama (2013)
 Make Your Move 3D (2013)
 The Imaginarium of Doctor Parnassus (2009)
 Dead Silence (2007)
 Tideland (2005)

 Recognition 
 2014 MTV Video Music Award for Best Art Direction - Arcade Fire: Reflektor - Winner
 2014 ADG Excellence in Production Design Award for Commercial, PSA, Promo, and Music Video - Arcade Fire: Reflektor - Nominated
 2013 DGC Craft Award for Outstanding Production Design - Feature Film - Mama - Nominated
 2010 Academy Award for Best Art Direction - The Imaginarium of Doctor Parnassus - Nominated
 2010 BAFTA Award for Best Production Design - The Imaginarium of Doctor Parnassus - Nominated
 2009 San Diego Film Critics Society Award for Best Art Direction - The Imaginarium of Doctor Parnassus - 2nd Place
 2009 Satellite Award for Best Art Direction & Production Design - The Imaginarium of Doctor Parnassus - Nominated
 2008 ADG Excellence in Production Design Award for Television Movie or Mini-Series - The Company'' - Nominated

References

External links 
 
Interview at Wide Angle / Closeup

Canadian production designers
Living people
1974 births
People from Toronto
Italian production designers
Canadian people of Calabrian descent
Canadian women in film